André Luis Neitzke, or simply Andre, (born 24 November 1986) is a Brazilian midfielder who plays for Swiss club Brühl.

Career
He played for Tokushima Vortis for three seasons.

On 5 September 2020, he returned to Schaffhausen on a three-year contract.

On 18 December 2021, Neitzke agreed to move to Brühl in January 2022.

Club statistics

References

External links
 

1986 births
Living people
Brazilian footballers
Brazilian expatriate footballers
J1 League players
J2 League players
Swiss Super League players
Swiss Challenge League players
Cerezo Osaka players
Tokushima Vortis players
São José Esporte Clube players
Porto Alegre Futebol Clube players
Veranópolis Esporte Clube Recreativo e Cultural players
Esporte Clube Taubaté players
Toledo Esporte Clube players
FC Schaffhausen players
FC Sion players
Neuchâtel Xamax FCS players
SC Brühl players
Brazilian expatriate sportspeople in Japan
Expatriate footballers in Japan
Brazilian expatriate sportspeople in Switzerland
Expatriate footballers in Switzerland
Brazilian people of German descent
Association football midfielders